Ian Stewart Gibson (30 March 1943 – 25 May 2016) was a Scottish professional footballer.

Career

Early career

A Scottish schoolboy international, Gibson began his career at Accrington Stanley, making his league debut at the age of 15, before joining Bradford Park Avenue in 1960. He spent two years in Bradford.

Middlesbrough

Gibson's form in Bradford saw Middlesbrough pay £30,000 to sign him in March 1962. He joined the club as it was entering a steady decline which saw them fall into the third division.

Coventry City

With Middlesbrough relegated in 1966 Gibson was signed by Coventry City for £57,000  and despite a major fall-out with manager Jimmy Hill he helped them win promotion to the First division in his first season, becoming one of the fan's most popular players. Despite numerous injuries in his four years at Coventry, under Noel Cantwell he helped them qualify for Europe in 1969–70 by virtue of finishing sixth in the First Division. During his four years at Highfield Road he played alongside the likes of Willie Carr, Neil Martin, George Curtis and Ernie Hannigan. 'Gibbo' as he was nicknamed was an active member of the Coventry City Former Players Association and attended a couple of matches every season at Coventry until his death.

Cardiff City

Gibson was sold to Cardiff City in 1970 for £35,000. He made his Cardiff debut on the opening day of the 1970–71 season in a 1–0 win over Leicester City and went on to provide numerous chances for the strikers he played alongside such as Brian Clark, John Toshack and Alan Warboys. After helping the side avoid relegation in his second year he was sold.

Bournemouth

Gibson went to Bournemouth in October 1972 for £100,000 but after only a few months a serious injury saw his professional career ended.

Honours
 Coventry City F.C. Hall of Fame

References

1943 births
2016 deaths
Scottish footballers
Accrington Stanley F.C. (1891) players
Bradford (Park Avenue) A.F.C. players
Middlesbrough F.C. players
Coventry City F.C. players
Cardiff City F.C. players
AFC Bournemouth players
English Football League players
People from Newton Stewart
Footballers from Dumfries and Galloway
Scotland under-23 international footballers
Whitby Town F.C. players
Berea Park F.C. players
Scottish expatriate footballers
Expatriate soccer players in South Africa
Highlands Park F.C. players
Association football midfielders